Partiban a/l K. Janasekaran (born 28 November 1992) is a Malaysian footballer who plays as a midfielder for Kuala Lumpur City.

Club career

Perak
On 8 November 2018, Partiban completed his transfer to Perak.

Career statistics

Club

International

Honours

Club
KL City FC
 Malaysia Cup: 2021

Terengganu
 Malaysia Premier League runner-up: 2017
 Malaysia Cup runner-up: 2018

Perak
 Malaysia FA Cup runner-up: 2019

References

External links
 

1992 births
Living people
People from Perak
Association football midfielders
Malaysian footballers
Malaysian people of Tamil descent
Malaysian sportspeople of Indian descent
Perak F.C. players
Sarawak FA players
Terengganu FC players
Kuala Lumpur City F.C. players
Malaysia Super League players
Malaysia Premier League players
Malaysia international footballers